Paul Maisonneuve (born 22 December 1986) is a French professional footballer who plays as a midfielder for Championnat National 2 club Bergerac.

External links
 

1986 births
Living people
Footballers from Nîmes
Association football midfielders
French footballers
Ligue 2 players
Championnat National players
Championnat National 2 players
Nîmes Olympique players
US Pontet Grand Avignon 84 players
Gazélec Ajaccio players
FC Martigues players
Pau FC players
Bergerac Périgord FC players